Gang Green is an American punk rock band originally from Braintree, Massachusetts. Chris Doherty (guitar), Bill Manley (bass) and Mike Dean (drums) started the band in 1980 and broke up in 1983. Doherty reformed Gang Green the following year, and the band experienced numerous lineup changes until its dissolution for the second time in 1992. Doherty has been the band's only constant member and has kept Gang Green active from 2005 onwards. The band was influential in the formation of the East Coast hardcore punk scene, and went on to become one of the forerunners of crossover thrash and speed metal in the late 1980s.

History

Formation and first hiatus (1980–1984) 
The first incarnation of the band in 1980 consisted of 15-year-olds Chris Doherty, Mike Dean, and Bill Manley, who contributed seven tracks to the This Is Boston, Not L.A. compilation in 1982, and one track to the follow-up Unsafe at Any Speed EP, also in 1982.

In mid-1983, the group disbanded, as lead singer Chris Doherty had already joined the band Jerry's Kids, for their album Is This My World?. In 1985, Gang Green released the 7" "Sold Out" on Taang! Records, the influential Boston label's first release. All of the tracks recorded by the original line up of Gang Green were later released on the Preschool CD, released by Taang! Records.

First reunion and Another Wasted Night (1984–1986) 
In late 1984, Chris Doherty reemerged with an all new Gang Green lineup consisting of former members of D.A.M.M. (Drunks Against Mad Mothers), The Freeze and Smegma And The Nunz. Chuck Stilphen (lead guitar), Glen Stilphen (bass, vocals) and Walter Gustafson (drums). This second lineup is the most famous nationally as it was both the first to tour and the one that recorded the songs "Alcohol" and "Skate to Hell". This edition of Gang Green released the Another Wasted Night LP on Taang! Records in 1986. This record is considered to be the band's best recording and is regarded as one of the definitive hardcore punk records of its time. This line-up of Doherty, Stilphen, Stilphen and Gustafson only existed for one year from November 1984 until November 1985 before Gustafson quit to pursue The Outlets. The sound of the band changed again after this point. The brothers went on to form Mallet Head and Scratch. Glen plays in The Northern Skulls with Jonah Jenkins (Only Living Witness, Milligram), Johnny Mullin and Michael Lefebvre.

The song "Alcohol" (C. Stilphen/C. Doherty) from Another Wasted Night has been covered by a number of bands. Tankard, a German thrash metal band, featured the song on their album Chemical Invasion. It was also covered by Impaled Nazarene, a black metal band from Finland. It appeared on their EP entitled Motörpenis which was released in 1996.
Boston punk rock band Dropkick Murphys covered the song on their "Back to the Hub" 7 inch. It also appeared on their live compilation, Live on St. Patrick's Day from Boston, MA.  Before The Meatmen covered "Alcohol", Tesco Vee's Hate Police featuring Keith Campbell and Tommy "Dog" Cohen, released it on a 7" on Sympathy For The Record Industry. Then it was also covered by The Meatmen on their album Pope on a Rope, and also by No Fun at All on their releases No Straight Angles (US edition), EP's Going Steady, and Master Celebrations.  Metallica also played the song live. The song was originally an instrumental entitled "The Drinking Song" before Doherty attached his lyrics.  "Alcohol" also appears on the soundtrack to the 2010 film Jackass 3D.

Roadrunner years (1987–1989) 
By 1987, when Gang Green were signed by Roadrunner Records the band's musical style had come to lean more toward heavy metal and the personnel of the band had changed completely after the Stilphen brothers departed at the end of 1986. This incarnation of Gang Green consisted of Doherty, Fritz Erickson (guitar), Joe Gittleman (bass) and former Jerry's Kids drummer Brian Betzger. In 1989, Gittleman was fired by Doherty and was replaced by Josh Pappe, formerly of Dirty Rotten Imbeciles. Gittleman returned to The Mighty Mighty Bosstones

Second hiatus (1990–1995) 
After touring the United States with Social Distortion in 1990, Gang Green experienced a few more lineup shuffles before being dropped by Roadrunner and going on hiatus for several years in which Doherty founded the bands Klover (Mercury Records) and Hamerd.

Second reunion (1996–2004) 
In 1996, Chris Doherty, Chuck Stilphen, Glen Stilphen and Walter Gustafson re-formed to play five East Coast dates including shows at The Rat and CBGB's. Later in 1996, Gang Green surfaced yet again with Walter Gustafson returning on drums, along with newcomers Mike Earls (guitar, vocals) and Matt Sandonato (bass, vocals). They re-signed with Taang! Records and in 1997 released Back & Gacked (EP) and Another Case of Brewtality. These records saw the band returning to their punk roots and even moving in a pop direction. Gang Green toured Europe and the U.S. extensively in 1997 and 1998. Doherty moved from Boston to Cincinnati shortly afterwards and, in the early 2000s, Gang Green played only once or twice a year in Boston and New York.

Third reunion (2005–2011) 
In 2005, Doherty and a new Gang Green lineup supported the Dropkick Murphys' west coast leg of their US tour.

In early 2007, the band toured through Florida and up the east coast of the US with bands such as Lucky Scars before heading out for a European tour scheduled for spring 2007 that included UK and Irish dates. These Irish dates were filmed for a live DVD by punk filmmaker, Lewis Smithingham.

Lineup of 2013–2018 
In 2013, Doherty teamed up with local Cincinnati music veterans Chris Donelly, Sean Boyle, and Dale Kishbaugh.

Band members

Current 
 Chris Doherty – vocals, guitar (1980–present)

Former and touring 

 Ray Jeffrey – guitar
 Chuck Stilphen – guitar (1984–1986, 1996)
 Tony Nichols – guitar (1986–1987)
 Fritz Erickson – guitar (1987–1990)
 Mike Lucantonio – guitar (1990–1992)
 Molly Flanagan – guitar and vocals (1991, 1992)
 Mike Earls – guitar (1996–1998, 2007–2011)
 Bryan Hinkley – guitar (1999)
 Bob Cenci – guitar (2005–2007)
 Bill Manley – bass (1980–1983)
 Glen Stilphen – bass (1984–1986, 1996)
 Joe Gittleman – bass (1986–1989)
 Josh Pappe – bass (1989–1991; died 2020)
 Kevin Brooks – bass (1991–1992)
 Matt Sandonato – bass (1996–1998, 2005–2011)
 Dusty Bryant - bass (2009)
 Mike Dean – drums (1980–1983)
 Brian Betzger – drums (1986–1991, 1991–1992)
 Nate Rubright – drums and vocals (1991, 1992)
 Walter Gustafson – drums (1984–1985, 1991, 1996–1998, 2005–2011)
 Troy Bryant- drums (2009)
 Davis Gunter – keyboards (2001)
 Dale Kishbaugh – drums (2013–2014)
 Chris Donnelly – vocals, guitar (2013–2019)
 Sean Boyle – vocals, bass (2014–2017)
 Matt Hemingway – drums (2014–2019)

Discography 

 Another Wasted Night (1986)
 You Got It (1987)
 I81B4U (EP) (1988)
 Can't Live Without It (1988)
 Older... Budweiser (1989)
 Another Case of Brewtality (1997)
 Back & Gacked (EP) (1997)

References

External links 

Hardcore punk groups from Massachusetts
Punk rock groups from Massachusetts
Musical groups established in 1980
1980 establishments in Massachusetts